144 riders across 24 six-member teams took part in the 2022 Tour de France Femmes. Twenty-five nationalities took part, with the largest percentage being Dutch (20% of the peloton). 109 riders finished the event.

Teams 

UCI Women's WorldTeams

 
 
 
 
 
 
 
 
 
 
 
 
 
 

UCI Women's Continental Teams

Cyclists

By starting number

By team

By nationality

Notes

References 

Grand Tour (cycling) squads
2022 Tour de France